The 2014 IIHF World Championship Division II was a pair of international Ice hockey tournaments organized by the International Ice Hockey Federation. Group A was contested in Belgrade, Serbia, running from 9 to 15 April 2014 and Group B was contested in Jaca, Spain, running from 5 to 11 April 2014. Divisions II A and II B represent the fourth and the fifth tier of the Ice Hockey World Championships.

Division II A

Participants

Standings

Results
All times are local (UTC+2).

Awards and statistics

Awards
Best players selected by the directorate:
 Best Goaltender:  Arsenije Ranković
 Best Defenceman:  Ingvar Jönsson
 Best Forward:  Robert Rooba
Source: IIHF.com

Scoring leaders
List shows the top skaters sorted by points, then goals.

GP = Games played; G = Goals; A = Assists; Pts = Points; +/− = Plus/minus; PIM = Penalties in minutes; POS = PositionSource: IIHF.com

Leading goaltenders
Only the top five goaltenders, based on save percentage, who have played at least 40% of their team's minutes, are included in this list.
TOI = Time on ice (minutes:seconds); SA = Shots against; GA = Goals against; GAA = Goals against average; Sv% = Save percentage; SO = ShutoutsSource: IIHF.com

Division II B

Participants

Final standings

Results
All times are local (UTC+2).

Awards and statistics

Awards
Best players selected by the directorate:
 Best Goaltender:  Ander Alcaine
 Best Defenceman:  Juan José Palacín
 Best Forward:  Oriol Boronat
Source: IIHF.com

Scoring leaders
List shows the top skaters sorted by points, then goals.

GP = Games played; G = Goals; A = Assists; Pts = Points; +/− = Plus/minus; PIM = Penalties in minutes; POS = PositionSource: IIHF.com

Leading goaltenders
Only the top five goaltenders, based on save percentage, who have played at least 40% of their team's minutes, are included in this list.
TOI = Time on ice (minutes:seconds); SA = Shots against; GA = Goals against; GAA = Goals against average; Sv% = Save percentage; SO = ShutoutsSource: IIHF.com

References

External links

Group A on IIHF.com
Group B on IIHF.com

IIHF World Championship Division II
3
Ere
IIHF World Championship Division II
2014 IIHF World Championship Division II
2014 IIHF World Championship Division II
2014 IIHF World Championship Division II
2010s in Belgrade
April 2014 sports events in Europe